Bertrand Maurice Daniel Olivier (born 1962) is a French-born British Anglican priest. Since 2018, he has served as Dean of Montreal and Rector of Christ Church Cathedral, Montreal in the Diocese of Montreal of the Anglican Church of Canada. He was previously a parish priest in the Diocese of Southwark (1996–2005) and then Vicar of All Hallows-by-the-Tower (2005–2018) in the Diocese of London, both of the Church of England.

Personal life
Olivier is gay. He is in a civil partnership with Paul, an IT worker.

References

 
 
 

1962 births
Living people
20th-century English Anglican priests
21st-century Canadian Anglican priests
French emigrants to the United Kingdom
LGBT Anglican clergy
Deans of Montreal
21st-century LGBT people